Fioletovo is a village in the Lori Province of Armenia. It was known as Nikitino until 1936, when it was renamed Fioletovo in honour of the Russian Communist activist and one of the 26 Baku Commissars Ivan Fioletov.

In the 1840s the villages was settled by Spiritual Christians relocated from Russia. Today it is inhabited by 3 congregation of Dukh-i-zhizniki and one congregation of Molokane.

The village has an extremely cold winter with a cool and mild summer. It lies under a thick layer of snow during the long winter season, where only the roofs of houses could be seen from the top with their smoking chimneys. The population of the village is diminishing year by year as the emigration is growing among its residents, who are trying to look for better economical conditions, either in Armenia or abroad.

Gallery

References 

Populated places in Lori Province
Erivan Governorate